Methanobrevibacter oralis is a species of coccobacillary, non-motile, Gram-positive, methane-producing archaeon.

References

Further reading

External links
LPSN

Type strain of Methanobrevibacter oralis at BacDive -  the Bacterial Diversity Metadatabase

Euryarchaeota
Archaea described in 1995